Cheyna Wood, previously known as Cheyna Tucker (born 2 October 1990 in Johannesburg) is a South African professional squash player. As of June 2022, she was ranked number 449 in the world. She reached a career-high world ranking of World No. 60 in December 2014. In June 2022 she won her first professional tournament, the Johannesburg Open, for which she had been given a wildcard.

References

1990 births
Living people
South African female squash players